The 2015 FIBA Intercontinental Cup was the 25th edition of the FIBA Intercontinental Cup. The series, played with two legs, was played by EuroLeague champions Real Madrid, and FIBA Americas League champions Bauru. Both games were played in the Ginásio do Ibirapuera, based in São Paulo. The first leg was played on September 25, the second one on September 27.

Qualified teams

First leg

Second leg

MVP

 Sergio Llull - ( Real Madrid)

References and notes

External links
2015 Intercontinental Basketball Cup
FIBA Intercontinental Cup Official website
Microsite by FIBA Americas

Intercontinental Cup (Basketball), 2015
FIBA Intercontinental Cup
International sports competitions in São Paulo
2015–16 in Brazilian basketball
International basketball competitions hosted by Brazil
2015–16 in Spanish basketball